The 1971 Tampa Spartans football team represented the University of Tampa in the 1971 NCAA College Division football season. It was the Spartans' 35th season. The team was led by head coach Bill Fulcher, in his first year, and played their home games at Tampa Stadium in Tampa, Florida. They finished with a record of six wins and five losses (6–5). Fulcher was hired on January 7, 1971, to serve as the replacement for Fran Curci who resigned to become the head coach at Miami.

Ranked No. 2 as they entered their game against Villanova, Tampa was upset by the Wildcats 24–3. After the loss, the Spartans would lose three of their next four games. A week after their loss at Louisville, Tampa returned home and lost to Ole Miss by a single point in a game that saw the Spartans score on touchdown passes of 93 and 49 yards. Tampa then rebounded the next week with a 43–7 win over East Carolina. On January 21, 1972, Fulcher resigned as head coach of the Spartans to take the same position at Georgia Tech.

Schedule

References

Tampa
Tampa Spartans football seasons
Tampa Spartans football